Kaxat-Xəl is a village in the Kalbajar District of Azerbaijan.

The village was occupied by Armenian forces during the First Nagorno-Karabakh war and administrated as part of Shahumyan Province of the self-proclaimed Republic of Artsakh. It was returned to Azerbaijan on 25 November 2020 per the 2020 Nagorno-Karabakh ceasefire agreement. It is suspected that this village has undergone a name change or no longer exists, as no Azerbaijani website mentions it under this name.

References
 

Populated places in Kalbajar District
Abolished villages in Kalbajar District